Rumpelstiltskin is a 1985 Canadian animated television special depicting the famous Brothers Grimm story of a miller's daughter and a little man who can spin straw into gold. Premiering on CTV in Canada and in the United States in syndication on December 14, 1985, Rumpelstiltskin was released onto home video in 1986, on VHS.
Family Home Entertainment was the distributor, in association with several Canadian animation firms.

The film was first released onto DVD on October 30, 2007 coupled with "The Tin Soldier", released in 1986, in a Holiday two-pack. Nelvana obtains the rights to this special as of 2007, although they weren't originally part of the special's production.

Cast
Christopher Plummer as The narrator
Robert Bockstael as Rumpelstiltskin
Charity Brown as Miller's Daughter
Les Lye as Miller
Al Baldwin as the King

References

Canadian animated short films
1980s animated short films
1985 animated films
1985 films
Films based on Rumpelstiltskin
Films directed by Pino van Lamsweerde
1980s Canadian films